Broomfield and Kingswood is a civil parish in the Maidstone district of Kent, England.  The parish lies to the east of Maidstone, south of the A20 road to Folkestone. According to the 2001 census it had a population of 1,545, increasing to 1,604 at the 2011 Census.  The parish covers the villages of Broomfield and Kingswood.

Town twinning
 Broomfield, Colorado

References

External links
 Broomfield and Kingswood Parish Council

Civil parishes in Kent